The discography of the Japanese pop group Sandaime J Soul Brothers consists of eight studio albums, two compilation albums, and twenty-six singles. Since the group's original formation in 1999, the group has experienced two line-up changes and reboots, and currently consists of seven members: Naoto Kataoka, Naoki Kobayashi, Ryuji Imaichi, Hiroomi Tosaka, Elly, Takanori Iwata, Kenjiro Yamashita. The group was formed by producer and former Exile member Hiroyuki Igarashi who founded the group's management agency LDH Japan.

Sandaime J Soul Brothers released their first single "Best Friend's Girl" in November 2010 which was certified gold by the Recording Industry Association of Japan peaking at number three on the Oricon Weekly Charts. Their first studio album "J Soul Brothers" released a year after also peaking at number three on the Oricon Weekly Charts. The group first saw major success in 2012 with the release of their promotional single "Hanabi", the song became a major hit that year, getting certified Triple Platinum and reaching number two on the Billboard Japan Hot 100, the song went on to win an Excellence Work award and a nomination for the Grand Prix at the Japan Record Awards. The following year the group's third studio album "Miracle" became their first number one album on the Oricon Albums Chart.

In 2014, their single "R.Y.U.S.E.I" hit number one both Oricon and Billboard Japan charts becoming the group's biggest commercial single at the time with the song earning Sandaime J Soul Brothers their first grand prix award at the Japan Record Awards. "R.Y.U.S.E.I." would eventually be certified Gold, Million and Silver by the Recording Industry Association of Japan on physical, digital and streaming certifications respectively. The song peaked at number nineteen in the yearly Billboard Japan Hot 100 charts and rose to number one yet again in 2015. The group's eighteenth single "Summer Madness" also peaked at number seven on the same Billboard yearly charts on that year.

The group released their best selling album "Planet Seven" which was also the second best selling album of the year in Japan in 2015. The album got a Million certification and is to date, their best selling studio album. The group followed up in 2016 with the release of their sixth studio album "The JSB Legacy" which had the group's highest daily sales for any of their albums and eventually sold 648,415 physical copies as well as being certified Triple Platinum.

Sandaime J Soul Brothers has had a total of six number-one albums and eight number-one singles throughout their discography, selling a total of more than 11.15 million records since their debut in 2010. The group has consistently been ranked among the highest earning groups in Japan since 2015, peaking twice as the highest earning group in mid 2016 and 2018 as reported by Oricon.

Discography

Studio albums

Compilation albums

Singles

As lead artists

As featured artists

Promotional singles

Videography

Video albums

Music videos

Footnotes

Notes

References

External links 
Official Sandaime J Soul Brothers discography page on their official website 

Discographies of Japanese artists
Pop music group discographies